α-Acetolactic acid is a precursor in the biosynthesis of the branched chain amino acids valine and leucine. α-Acetolactic acid is produced from two molecules of pyruvic acid by acetolactate synthase. α-Acetolactic acid can also be decarboxylated by alpha-acetolactate decarboxylase to produce acetoin. The name α-acetolactate is used for  anion (conjugate base), salts, and esters of α-acetolactic acid.

References

Alpha hydroxy acids
Beta-keto acids